Alberto Jammaron (April 25, 1915 – November 4, 2016) was an Italian cross-country skier who competed in the 1930s. From 1945 to 1947 he was also president of the Sci Club La Thuile-Rutor.

Selected results 
 1937: 3rd, member of the Bronze team at the 5th Trofeo Mezzalama
 1938: 6th, FIS Nordic World Ski Championships 4 x 10 km relay, together with Giulio Gerardi, Goffredo Baur and Vincenzo Demez
 1939: 3rd, FIS Nordic World Ski Championships 4 x 10 km relay, together with Aristide Compagnoni, Severino Compagnoni and Goffredo Baur
 1940: 1st, Italian men's championships of cross-country skiing, 18 km
 1941:
 3rd, FIS Nordic World Ski Championships 4 x 10 km relay, together with Aristide Compagnoni, Severino Compagnoni and Giulio Gherardi
 2nd, Italian men's championships of cross-country skiing, 18 km

References 

1915 births
2016 deaths
FIS Nordic World Ski Championships medalists in cross-country skiing
Italian centenarians
Italian male cross-country skiers
Italian male ski mountaineers
Men centenarians